Mount Cunningham is a mountain at the west end of South Georgia's Esmark Glacier. It is situated between Jossac Bight and Queen Maud Bay. The mountain was named after Scottish mountaineer John Crabbe Cunningham as a memorial after his death on 31 January 1980, following a climbing accident when struck by waves off Holyhead.

Namesake
Cunningham was a well known Scottish climber who spent many years developing innovative ice climbing techniques and pushing rock climbing standards. He worked not only for the British Antarctic Survey (BAS), but also the Glenmore Lodge and I M Marsh Campus in Liverpool. He served in the BAS of the British Antarctic Territory (BAT). On 23 November 1964, Cunningham became the first to climb Antarctica's Mount Jackson; he was also Station Commander of Adelaide Island in 1964–65, as well as a member of the South Georgia Survey of 1955–56.

Geography
Mount Cunningham is the 16th highest peak in the list of mountain peaks in South Georgia and the South Sandwich Islands. It is situated outside the BAT. Situated west of the Allardyce Range and northwest of Esmark Glacier, nearby mountains are the Warburton Peak, Bomford Peak, Pyramid Peak, Smillie Peak, Stanley Peak, and Comer Crag. The mountain peaks are not connected. With sharply-rising cliffs facing the sea, Mount Cunningham is situated at the head of low tussock-covered hills near the enclosed King Haakon Bay, an inlet on the southern coast. The headland of Cape Nunez is directly to the south while Jossac Bight is to the southeast.

References

Mountains and hills of South Georgia